The list shows the municipalities (comuni) of the autonomous province of Trento, Italy. Trentino is divided into 176 administrative subdivisions (Comuni/Gemeinden). Some municipalities have a second official language such as German (Cimbrian and Mócheno) and Ladin. Most German names of municipalities however are historical apart from the previously mentioned communities. The Ladin variety of the Fassa Valley is currently the only officially recognized one, in contrast to the varieties of Non and Sole Valley).

See also 
 Municipalities of South Tyrol
 Prontuario dei nomi locali dell'Alto Adige